Lloyd St. Amand (born November 10, 1952 in Sarnia, Ontario) is a Canadian politician and a former Member of Parliament for the riding of Brant. He is a member of the Liberal Party of Canada.

Born in Sarnia, Ontario, he received his Bachelor of Arts degree from the University of Western Ontario and his law degree in 1977 from the University of Windsor.

Since 1979, St. Amand has been a resident of Brantford, Brant's most populous urban centre, where he has practiced family and criminal law. He has volunteered within the community with several organizations, including St. Joseph's Hospital, Brant Waterways Foundation, Big Brothers, Nova Vita Women's Services, and Brant United Way.

St. Amand is a past president of the Brant Federal Liberal Association and was an active supporter of Jane Stewart's successful election campaigns in 1993, 1997, and 2000. After Stewart announced she would not run for re-election in the 2004 federal election, St. Amand ran to become the Liberal candidate for her riding and succeeded. He subsequently won the riding in the 2004 election.

He chaired the House Standing Committee on Aboriginal Affairs and Northern Development from Oct. 4, 2004 - Nov. 29, 2005. He was Assistant/Associate Critic for the Environment Feb. 23, 2006 - Jan. 17, 2007.

Electoral record

References

External links

1952 births
Franco-Ontarian people
Liberal Party of Canada MPs
Living people
Members of the House of Commons of Canada from Ontario
Politicians from Brantford
People from Sarnia
University of Western Ontario alumni
University of Windsor alumni
21st-century Canadian politicians